Torrente may refer to:

 Torrent (stream) (Italian torrente), a stream or fairly small river with a markedly high seasonal variation in its flow
 Torrente (fashion house), a Parisian haute couture fashion house; current creative director Julien Fournié
 "El Torrente", a song by Minus the Bear from the 2005 album Menos el Oso
 Torrente (music), a harmonic and rhythmic pattern in traditional Panamanian music
 Torrente de Cinca, a municipality located in the province of Huesca, Aragon, Spain
 Torrent, Valencia, a municipality located in the province of Valencia, Spain

People
 Dario Torrente (born 1966), South African fencer
 Gaspar Torrente (1888–1970), Aragonese nationalist
 Gonzalo Torrente Ballester (1910–1999), Spanish novelist
 Gonzalo Torrente Malvido (1935–2011), Spanish novelist and screenwriter
 Javier Torrente (born 1969), Argentine football manager
 Manuel Torrente (fl. 1908–1948), Argentine fencer
 Vincenzo Torrente (born 1966), Italian football player and coach

Cinema and television
 Torrente, el brazo tonto de la ley, 1998 Spanish film directed by Santiago Segura
Torrente 2: Misión en Marbella, 2001
Torrente 3: El protector, 2005
Torrente 4: Lethal Crisis, 2011
Torrente 5: Operación Eurovegas, 2014
 José Luis Torrente, main character in the previous films and interpreted by Santiago Segura himself
 Torrente (telenovela), a Venezuelan telenovela which aired in 2008

See also
Torrent (disambiguation)